Contactees are persons who claim to have experienced contact with extraterrestrials. Some claimed ongoing encounters, while others claimed to have had as few as a single encounter. Evidence is anecdotal in all cases.

As a cultural phenomenon, contactees perhaps had their greatest notoriety from the late 1940s to the late 1950s, but individuals continue to make similar claims in the present. Some have shared their messages with small groups of followers, and many contactees have written books, published magazine and newspaper articles, issued newsletters or spoken at UFO conventions.

The contactee movement has seen serious attention from academics and mainstream scholars. Among the earliest was the 1956 study, When Prophecy Fails by Leon Festinger, Henry Riecken, and Stanley Schachter, which analyzed the phenomenon. There have been at least two university-level anthologies of scientific papers regarding the contactee movements.

Contactee accounts are generally different from those who allege alien abduction, in that while contactees usually describe positive experiences involving humanoid aliens, abductees rarely describe their experiences positively.

Overview
Astronomer J. Allen Hynek described contactees thus:
The visitation to the earth of generally benign beings whose ostensible purpose is to communicate (generally to a relatively few selected and favored persons) messages of "cosmic importance". These chosen recipients generally have repeated contact experiences, involving additional messages

Contactees became a cultural phenomenon in the 1940s and continued throughout the 1950s and 1960s, often giving lectures and writing books about their experience. The phenomenon still exists today. Skeptics often hold that such "contactees" are deluded or dishonest in their claims. Susan Clancy wrote that such claims are "false memories" concocted out of a "blend of fantasy-proneness, memory distortion, culturally available scripts, sleep hallucinations, and scientific illiteracy".

Contactees usually portrayed aliens as more or less identical in appearance and mannerisms to humans. The aliens are also almost invariably reported as disturbed by the violence, crime, and wars that infest the earth, and by the possession of various earth nations of nuclear and thermonuclear weapons.
Curtis Peebles summarizes the common features of many contactee claims:
 Certain humans have had physical or mental contact with seemingly benevolent, humanoid space aliens.
 The contactees have also flown aboard seemingly otherworldly spacecraft and traveled into space and to other planets.
 The Aliens want to help mankind solve its problems, to stop nuclear testing and prevent the otherwise inevitable destruction of the human race.
 This will be accomplished very simply by the brotherhood spreading a message of love and brotherhood across the world.
 Other sinister beings, the Men in Black, use threats and force to continue the cover-up of UFOs, and suppress the message of hope.

History

Early examples
As early as the 18th century, people like Emanuel Swedenborg were claiming to be in psychic contact with inhabitants of other planets. 1758 saw the publication of Concerning Earths in the Solar System, in which Swedenborg detailed his alleged journeys to the inhabited planets. J. Gordon Melton notes that Swedenborg's planetary tour stops at Saturn, the furthest planet discovered during Swedenborg's era, he did not visit then unknown Uranus, Neptune or Pluto.

In 1891, Thomas Blott's book The Man From Mars was published. The author claimed to have met a Martian in Kentucky. Unusually for an early contactee, Blott reported that the Martian communicated not via telepathy, but in English.

1900s
George Adamski, who later became probably the most prominent contactee of the UFO era, was one contactee with an earlier interest in the occult. Adamski founded the Royal Order of Tibet in the 1930s. Writes Michael Barkun, "His [later] messages from the Venusians sounded suspiciously like his own earlier occult teachings."

Christopher Partridge notes, importantly, that the pre-1947 contactees "do not involve UFOs".

Contactees in the UFO era
In support of their claims, early 1950s contactees often produced photographs of the alleged flying saucers or their occupants. A number of photos of a "Venusian scout ship" by George Adamski and identified by him as a typical extraterrestrial flying saucer were noted to suspiciously bear a remarkable resemblance to a type of once commonly available chicken egg incubator, complete with three light bulbs which Adamski said were "landing gear".

For over two decades, contactee George Van Tassel hosted the annual "Giant Rock Interplanetary Spacecraft Convention" in the Mojave Desert.

Response to contactee claims
Even in ufology—itself subject to at best very limited and sporadic mainstream scientific or academic interest—contactees were generally seen as the lunatic fringe, and serious ufologists subsequently avoided the subject, for fear it would harm their attempts at serious study of the UFO phenomenon. Jacques Vallée notes, "No serious investigator has ever been very worried by the claims of the 'contactees'."

Carl Sagan has expressed skepticism about contactees and alien contact in general, remarking that aliens seem very happy to answer vague questions but when confronted with specific, technical questions they are silent:

Occasionally, by the way, I get a letter from someone who is in "contact" with an extraterrestrial who invites me to "ask anything". And so I have a list of questions. The extraterrestrials are very advanced, remember. So I ask things like, "Please give a short proof of Fermat's Last Theorem." Or the Goldbach Conjecture. And then I have to explain what these are, because extraterrestrials will not call it Fermat's Last Theorem, so I write out the little equation with the exponents. I never get an answer. On the other hand, if I ask something like "Should we humans be good?" I always get an answer. I think something can be deduced from this differential ability to answer questions. Anything vague they are extremely happy to respond to, but anything specific, where there is a chance to find out if they actually know anything, there is only silence.

Some time after the phenomenon had waned, Temple University historian David M. Jacobs noted a few interesting facts: the accounts of the prominent contactees grew ever more elaborate, and as new claimants gained notoriety, they typically backdated their first encounter, claiming it occurred earlier than anyone else's. Jacobs speculates that this was an attempt to gain a degree of "authenticity" to trump other contactees.

List of contactees
Those who claim to be contactees include:

 George Adamski
 Wayne Sulo Aho
 Orfeo Angelucci
 Truman Bethurum
 Daniel Fry
 Gabriel Green
 Steven M. Greer
 Betty and Barney Hill
 George King
 Elizabeth Klarer
 Aladino Félix (aka Dino Kraspedon)
 Gloria Lee
 Nancy Lieder

 Riley Martin
 Billy Meier
 Howard Menger
 Buck Nelson
 Ted Owens
 Sixto Paz Wells
 Reinhold O. Schmidt

 Whitley Strieber
 Sun Ra
 George Van Tassel
 Samuel Eaton Thompson
 Claude Vorilhon
 George Hunt Williamson
 Dwight York

References

External links
 Another overview of 1950s contactees
 Another survey of 1950s contactees and their associated religious cults